Aristolochia gorgona is a recently discovered (2002) flowering plant in the Dutchman's pipe family (Aristolochiaceae) (of the Eudicot super-order or subclass) found in the Atlantic-facing rainforests of Costa Rica and Panama. It differs from Aristolochia grandiflora in lacking the sometimes very long "tail" that hangs down from the trumpet of A. grandiflora, in being darker (sometimes even purple) and in being covered with inch-long (2.5 cm) tendril-like enations which have suggested a comparison to Medusa and her sisters. Its discoverer, Blanco thought its very late discovery might be due to its similarity to A. grandiflora. This resemblance must be that of the foliage, for as we have seen the flowers are very different.

References

gorgona
Plants described in 2002